The following list is of important municipalities in the Basque Country, an autonomous community of Spain:

Provincial lists 
The following links are to lists which are more detailed province-specific, and all municipalities in a given province are ranked by population.

 List of municipalities in Álava
 List of municipalities in Biscay 
 List of municipalities in Gipuzkoa

By population

See also
Comarcas of the Basque Country

References